Botham is a surname and given name. People with the name include:

Surname 
 A family of British sportspeople:
 Lord Ian Botham (born 1955), English cricketer and sports commentator; family patriarch
 Liam Botham (born 1977), English rugby union, rugby league, and cricket player; son of Sir Ian
 James Botham (born 1998), Welsh rugby union player; son of Liam
 Les Botham (1930–1999), Australian cricketer
 Noel Botham (1940–2012), British tabloid journalist and author
 Roy Botham (born 1923), British swimmer
 Sandy Botham (born 1965), American basketball coach
 Mary Botham Howitt (1799–1888), English poet

Given name 
 Botham Jean (1991–2018), Saint Lucian / American accountant and murder victim